McCracken County High School is a public secondary school (grades 9–12) located west of Paducah, Kentucky that opened on August 9, 2013. Operated by the McCracken County Public Schools district, it consolidates that district's three former high schools—Heath, Lone Oak, and Reidland. Before ground was broken for the new school in June 2010, the school's nickname of Mustangs and colors of crimson, black, and white had been finalized. The school opened with an enrollment of slightly under 1,900.

Consolidation plans began taking shape in the mid-2000s due to signs of overcrowding at some of the existing high schools. Residents of the county school district (the Paducah school district, which includes most of the city's population, did not participate in the consolidation) voted in November 2008 to approve the new high school. The original opening date for the school was August 2012, but it was delayed because all of the bids for construction came in above the originally planned budget.

The school is organized into a house system, a common feature at schools in many Commonwealth countries but rare in the U.S. Each student is assigned to one of five houses, each with its own principal, guidance counselor, and teachers. Most core courses are taught in the student's own house; electives may be taught in any part of the building.

As of the 2021–22 school year, the school had an enrollment of 2,030 students and 113 classroom teachers (on an FTE basis), for a student–teacher ratio of 18:1. There were 815 students (37% of enrollment) eligible for free lunch and 67 (3% of students) eligible for reduced-cost lunch.

State champions
Boys Bowling: 2021
Girls Tennis: 2015, 2016, 2017
Softball: 2015
Coed Cheer 2021 Region Champions
Dance team: 2019 state Champions

References

External links
 McCracken County High School

Educational institutions established in 2013
Schools in McCracken County, Kentucky
Public high schools in Kentucky
2013 establishments in Kentucky